King's Highway 21, commonly referred to as Highway 21, is a provincially maintained highway in the Canadian province of Ontario that begins at Highway 402 midway between Sarnia and London and ends at Highway 6, Highway 10 and Highway 26 in Owen Sound. The roadway is referred to as the Bluewater Highway because it remains very close to the eastern shoreline of Lake Huron.

Highway 21 was first designated by the Department of Highways (DHO) between Highway 3 and Highway 7 in mid-1927 and extended to Goderich in 1934. A year later, a final extension completed the route to Owen Sound. In 1997 and 1998, the portion of the route south of Highway 402 was transferred to the counties in which it laid. This segment is also known as Oil Heritage Road.

Highway 21 is often subject to winter closures due to lake effect caused by snowsquall, which can create sudden whiteout conditions along the Lake Huron shoreline. Several Emergency Detour Routes have been established further inland to guide drivers around such closures. Care should be taken during the winter months, as the storms can progress rapidly and unexpectedly.

Route description 

Highway 21 is a long lakeside route through Southwestern Ontario, which serves numerous communities along the eastern shoreline of Lake Huron. Once over  longer than it is today, the highway now begins at Highway 402 near the community of Warwick, where it progresses north through the towns of Forest, Grand Bend, Goderich, Point Clark, Kincardine, Tiverton, Port Elgin, and Southampton. At Southampton, the highway veers away from the Lake Huron shoreline and travels east to Owen Sound.

The route is generally smoothly-flowing, but can be somewhat congested through towns during the summer from tourists and cottagers.
Highway 21 is often subject to closures at various points as it lies on the lee shore of Lake Huron. Lake effect snow squalls frequently subject motorists to poor visibility and slippery conditions, leading to whiteout conditions. Therefore, the Ontario Provincial Police claim that the road is the most-commonly closed in the province.

The highway begins at Exit 34 and progresses north towards Lake Huron. The mostly-straight section of the route lies within Lambton County and passes through the town of Forest. Near Kettle Point, the route abruptly curves north west and begins to parallel the shore of the lake, providing access to the village of Port Franks and The Pinery Provincial Park prior to entering Grand Bend. North of that village, the highway crosses into Huron County and intersects former Highway 83. Between there and Goderich, the west side of the highway is dominated by roads providing access to shoreline cottages.

At Goderich, the route encounters Highway 8, then crosses the Maitland River along a bypass constructed during the early 1960s; the original routing followed portions of Saltford Street and River Ridge Crescent. The highway proceeds straight north as the baseline at the shore of Lake Huron until it reaches Sheppardton. The route curves northeast as it enters Bruce County to align with the surveying grid and proceeds out of Amberley towards Kincardine.

Between Amberley and Tiverton, Highway 21 travels straight-as-an-arrow along what was originally a rural concession road through the hamlets of Reid's Corners, Pine River, Huron Ridge and Slade. It bypasses inland of Kincardine, intersecting the western terminus of Highway 9. Within Tiverton, which acts as the primary town serving Bruce Nuclear Generating Station, traffic must turn to remain on Highway 21. As it exits southeast from the town, the highway makes a broad curve to the northeast and continues through the hamlets of Underwood and North Bruce.

As it approaches the southern end of the Bruce Peninsula, the route bisects Port Elgin, then curves abruptly towards Lake Huron and passes through Southampton before curving to the east towards Owen Sound. Between those two places, the highway is generally straight, except at the boundary between Bruce and Grey Counties as well as the descent of the Niagara Escarpment at Springmount. Several communities line the inland stretch of highway, including Chippewa Hill, Kelly's Corners, Elsinore, Allenford, Alvanley and Jackson. At Springmount, the route encounters Highway 6, which joins Highway 21 to form Ontario's only wrong-way concurrency east to Owen Sound.

History 

Highway 21 was the first King's Highway in Lambton County when it was assumed in 1927 between Highway 3 at Morpeth and Highway 7 at Reece's Corners. The original section of highway was rebuilt from a muddy trail to a plank road around 1860. When James Miller Williams, a Hamilton businessman, set out one day during a drought to dig a well, he chose a spot downhill from an existing oil seep in the village of Black Creek. Instead of encountering water, Williams hit a shallow oil deposit. As a result of the ensuing oil boom, which would begin the petroleum industry in North America, Williams laid out the village and changed its name to Oil Springs. Two competing plank road companies were formed, the Black Creek Plank Road Company (of which Williams was a principal investor) and the Sarnia to Florence Plank Road Company, both of which aimed their roads through Oil Springs. Although both roads were constructed, the former company was more prosperous in its endeavours; in 1886, a significant portion of the Sarnia to Florence Plank Road was closed up and turned over to local property owners. The Black Creek Plank Road Company meanwhile had transformed the muddy quagmire of a path into a well-maintained road. By 1863, three miles of road south of Wyoming had been paved, and the remainder south to Oil Springs planked (the Sarnia Road followed two years later). However, as the oil boom faded, so too did improvement to the road.

On May25 and June1, 1927, the Department of Highways assumed the unpaved road between Highway 7 at Reece's Corner and Highway 3 at Morpeth, via Dresden, Thamesville and Ridgetown as Provincial Highway 21,
which was changed to the current King's Highway 21 in 1930.
That year, the department set out to improve the new highway. Concrete slabs were laid between Petrolia and Highway 7, as well as along a  section between Thamesville and Dresden. The following year, the route was paved between Dresden and Edys Mills before the effects of the Great Depression forced the department to concentrate on paving Highway 22. The election of a new government in mid-1934 led to the resumption of work in June as a depression relief project. New equipment (namely a Caterpillar Excavator), as well as the expertise of Andy Newman, an engineer who was hired when he demonstrated his abilities with the machinery upon passing a construction site on his drive home. Newman, who helped design the machine that nobody else could operate, allowed work to proceed at a much faster rate than before. The machinery could dig quicker than 50 men, and the effort showed when the gap between Petrolia and Edys Mills and the remaining gaps between Dresden and Thamesville were graded and paved by the end of the summer. On October 19, 1934, Highway 21 was officially opened by Robert Mellville Smith, deputy minister of the Department of Highways.

On April 4, 1934, Highway 21 was assumed through Huron County as far north as Goderich, which was followed by the assumption of a section through Bosanquet Township on April 18, creating a  concurrency with Highway 7 from Reece's Corners to Thedford. From there, the route travelled through Thedford to Port Franks, where it merged into the present highway.
A final  extension to Owen Sound was assumed on May 15, 1935,

Meanwhile, on April 11, 1934, the department assumed control of a road connecting Highway 7 with Forest as Highway 21A. It was later extended to connect with Highway 21 at Port Franks on August 19, 1936.
By 1938, Highway 21A had been renumbered as Highway 21, and Highway 21 through Thedford renumbered as Highway 82.

Beginning in 1960, a small bypass of Highway 21 was constructed on the north side of Goderich,
avoiding a nearby hairpin turn.
The  curving structure over the Maitland River was completed in mid-1961 at a cost of C$1.39 million and opened ceremoniously on July 17, 1962.

During the early 1980s, the construction of Highway 402 east from Sarnia resulted in a shift in the route of the highway. The route was extended north from Reece's Corners to Exit 25, while the section from Highway 7 north to Exit 34 was "downloaded", or transferred to the local municipality in which it resided. With Highway 402 as the connecting provincial link between the two segments of Highway 21, the two parclo interchanges each include a directional ramp to facilitate traffic.

Further transfers were performed in 1997 and 1998. On April 1, 1997, the section of Highway 21 from Highway 401 south to Morpeth was transferred to Kent County.
On January 1, 1998, the section between Highway 401 and Highway 402 was transferred to Kent and Lambton counties.

Major intersections

References 

Footnotes

Bibliography

021
Transport in Goderich, Ontario
Transport in Owen Sound
Transport in Grey County
Transport in Huron County, Ontario